Daniel Robinson, aged 24, was last seen leaving a job site in Buckeye, Arizona near Sun Valley Parkway and Cactus Road on June 23, 2021 around 9:15 am, in his 2017 blue-grey Jeep Renegade headed west towards the desert, and reported missing later that day.

Background 
Robinson is described by investigators and family as a 5'8" African American man, who weighed 165 pounds at the time of his disappearance. He has black hair and brown eyes, and is missing part of his right forearm, including his hand.

Disappearance 
Robinson was last seen leaving his job site in Buckeye, Arizona on June 23, 2021 by a coworker he had just met that day, where he was working as a geologist. He had moved into the Phoenix area after graduating as a field geologist in 2019. 

On July 19, 2021, a rancher found the Jeep rolled over on its side in a ravine on his property, with the airbags deployed, and evidence in the vehicle indicating that the driver was wearing a seatbelt at the time of the crash. Several personal items of Robinson’s were found with the vehicle, such as his cell phone, wallet, keys, and clothes.

Investigation 
In late July 2021, a human skull was found in the area south of where Robinson’s vehicle was recovered. Testing later indicated that the skull was not that of Robinson, and no additional human remains were recovered at that time.

In a statement made on September 16 2021, the Buckeye Police Department announced that they had worked with outside agencies to search over 70 square miles, with the assistance of UTVs, cadaver dogs, drones, and helicopters. After the discovery of the Jeep, Robinson’s family hired an accident reconstructionist and private investigator, who suggested that the accident scene had been staged. They stated that after the airbags deployed, the ignition was turned over 46 more times, and that there was an additional 11 miles on the car that registered after the car crashed.

Investigators in October 2021 announced that Robinson had been texting a woman he met while delivering for Instacart, and reportedly was invited inside and exchanged numbers with her. Later text messages showed that he visited her home several times unannounced, and the woman indicated that she was extremely uncomfortable with his actions. Police initially interviewed friends, family, and coworkers about Robinson being suicidal over the situation, but all told investigators that he was not.

On November 9, 2021, it was announced that a second set of human remains had been discovered while searching for Robinson, and had been sent out for DNA testing and identification. The preliminary investigation, based on anthropological indication of race and the amount of time outside, has led officials to believe neither set of remains to be Robinson.

Response 
Robinson’s father has been critical of the effort put into locating his son by local law enforcement, claiming that he has done more in attempting to locate his son from Phoenix than law enforcement has. The family has also put together a GoFundMe page to help gather donations, and a petition to keep interest in the case. Robinson's parents participated in the Facebook Watch series Red Table Talk to discuss Robinson's disappearance, and the difficulties they faced working with investigators to search for their son.

Social media has also pointed out the lack of national attention that was being given to Robinson’s case compared to that of the disappearance of Gabby Petito.

References 

2020s missing person cases
June 2021 events in the United States
Missing person cases in Arizona